Poisson clumping, or Poisson bursts, is a phenomenon where random events may appear to occur in clusters, clumps, or bursts.

Etymology
Poisson clumping is named for 19th-century French mathematician Siméon Denis Poisson, known for his work on definite integrals, electromagnetic theory, and probability theory, and after whom the Poisson distribution is also named.

History
The Poisson process provides a description of random independent events occurring with uniform probability through time and/or space. The expected number λ of events in a time interval or area of a given measure is proportional to that measure. The distribution of the number of events follows a Poisson distribution entirely determined by the parameter λ. If  λ is small, events are rare, but may nevertheless occur in clumps—referred to as Poisson clumps or bursts—purely by chance.

Applications
Poisson clumping is used to explain marked increases or decreases in the frequency of an event, such as shark attacks, "coincidences", birthdays, heads or tails from coin tosses, and e-mail correspondence.

Poisson clumping heuristic
The poisson clumping heuristic (PCH), published by David Aldous in 1989, is a model for finding first-order approximations over different areas in a large class of stationary probability models. The probability models have a specific monotonicity property with large exclusions. The probability that this will achieve a large value is asymptotically small and is distributed in a Poisson fashion.

See also
Burstiness

References

Poisson point processes
Markov processes